Peters Bastion is the large, mainly ice-free mountain forming the northernmost summit of the Eland Mountains, in Palmer Land. Mapped by United States Geological Survey (USGS) in 1974. Named by Advisory Committee on Antarctic Names (US-ACAN) for Commander Vernon W. Peters, U.S. Navy, Commanding Officer of Squadron VXE-6 in Antarctica during Operation Deep Freeze, 1974.

Mountains of Palmer Land